Lake Toftir is a lake on the island of Eysturoy in the Faroe Islands.

Lake Toftir is located between the villages of Toftir and Rituvík. It is the fourth-largest natural lake in the Faroe Islands and it measures . The lake is noted for its rich bird life.

References

External links
Photo of Lake Toftir

Toftir
Eysturoy